The 1936 Navy Midshipmen football team represented the United States Naval Academy during the 1936 college football season. In their third season under head coach Tom Hamilton, the Midshipmen compiled a  record and outscored their opponents by a combined score of  They finished the season ranked 18th in the first year of the AP Poll.

Schedule

References

Navy
Navy Midshipmen football seasons
Navy Midshipmen football